Senyo may refer to:

 Sényő, a village in the Northern Great Plain region of eastern Hungary
 Senyo Kogyo, Ltd., Japanese entertainment group and giant Ferris wheel constructor
 Kurobe Senyō Railway, in Toyama Prefecture, Japan